Aleksei Shaposhnikov may refer to:
 Aleksei Shaposhnikov (footballer), Soviet footballer (1899–1962)
 Aleksei Shaposhnikov (politician), Russian politician (born 1973)